Ricardo Acuña (born 23 January 1971) is a Mexican judoka. He competed in the 1996 Summer Olympics.

References

1971 births
Living people
Judoka at the 1996 Summer Olympics
Mexican male judoka
Olympic judoka of Mexico
20th-century Mexican people